Abortion in Washington is legal up to the point of fetal viability. 60% of adults said in a poll by the Pew Research Center that abortion should be legal in all or most cases.

Washington currently has nineteen abortion clinics. The number of clinics has declined over the years, with 95 in 1982, 65 in 1992, and 33 in 2014. There were 17,710 legal abortions performed in the state in 2014, and 17,098 in 2015.

In Washington politics, the Washington State Democratic Party supports access to abortion while the Washington State Republican Party opposes abortion, which has led to proposed legislation by Republicans that would restrict or ban abortion.

History

Legislative history 
By 1950, the state legislature passed a law stating that a woman who had an abortion or actively sought to have an abortion, regardless of whether she went through with it, was guilty of a criminal offense.

Abortion was made legal in 1970. Prior to that, it was illegal in the state, with a therapeutic exception if the life of the mother was at risk. In 1971, the state repealed its statute that said inducing an abortion was a criminal offense. Hawaii, New York, Alaska, and Washington were the first states to repeal their abortion laws in the pre-Roe v. Wade era. Still, state law in 1971 required that any woman getting a legal abortion in the state needed to be a resident for some specific period between 30 and 90 days.

As of 2017, Washington State, New Mexico, Illinois, Alaska, Maryland, Massachusetts, Connecticut, and New Jersey allow certain qualified non-physicians to prescribe drugs for medical abortions only. In August 2018, the state had a law to protect the right to have an abortion. In February 2019, the Washington State Attorney General issued an opinion that the physician-only clause of Washington State abortion law (I-120) was unenforceable, and that aspiration and medication abortion prior to viability was within the scope of nurse practitioners and physician assistants. As of May 14, 2019, the state prohibits abortions after the fetus is viable, generally some point between week 24 and 28. This period uses a standard defined by the US Supreme Court in 1973 with the Roe v. Wade ruling.

Ballot box history 
In November 1970, Washington held a referendum on legalizing early pregnancy abortions, becoming the first state to legalize abortion through a vote of the people. In 1991, a ballot box measure passed that made abortion legal up to the point where a fetus was viable.

Clinic history 
Between 1982 and 1992, the number of abortion clinics in the state declined by thirty, going from 95 in 1982 to 65 in 1992. In 2014, there were 33 abortion clinics in the state. In 2014, 64% of the counties in the state did not have an abortion clinic. That year, 15% of women in the state aged 15–44 lived in a county without an abortion clinic. In March 2016, there were 35 Planned Parenthood clinics in the state. In 2017, there were 34 Planned Parenthood clinics, of which 26 offered abortion services, in a state with a population of 1,645,293 women aged 15–49.

On June 11, 2001, an unsolved bombing took place at a clinic in Tacoma, Washington, destroying a wall and resulting in $6,000 in damages. On September 4, 2015, a Planned Parenthood clinic in Pullman, Washington, was intentionally set on fire. No injuries were reported due to the time of day, but the FBI was involved because of a history of domestic terrorism against the clinic. The crime was never solved. The clinic reopened six months later.

Statistics 

In 1990, 606,000 women in the state faced the risk of an unintended pregnancy. In 2014, 60% of adults said in a poll by the Pew Research Center that abortion should be legal in all or most cases. In 2017, the state had an infant mortality rate of 3.9 deaths per 1,000 live births.

Abortion financing 
Seventeen states including Washington use their own funds to cover all or most "medically necessary" abortions sought by low-income women under Medicaid, thirteen of which are required by State court orders to do so. In 2010, the state had 14,236 publicly funded abortions, of which were zero federally funded and 14,236 were state funded.

Abortion rights views and activities 

Women from the state participated in marches supporting abortion rights as part of a #StoptheBans movement in May 2019.

Anti-abortion views and activities

Violence 
Two documented arson attacks on abortion clinics took place in 1983 including one in Washington. Between this attack and one in Virginia, over US$500,000 in damage was done to the two clinics.

References 

Washington
Healthcare in Washington (state)
Women in Washington (state)